The discography of German synth-pop group Alphaville.

Albums

Studio albums

Live albums

Remix albums

Compilation albums

Box sets

Video albums

Singles

References

External links
 
 

Discographies of German artists
Pop music group discographies
New wave discographies